Club Esportiu Europa is the women's football section of CE Europa, Spanish football club. Founded in 2001, it currently plays in the Group 3 of the Primera Nacional.

History
CE Europa was founded in 2001. In only three seasons the team reached the Segunda División.

The club spent eight seasons in Segunda División, before being relegated in 2012 to the third tier. Europa immediately came back after promoting in the next season.

Stadium
CE Europa holds its home games at Nou Sardenya, with a 7,000-spectators capacity and opened on 1 December 1940.

Titles
 Regional (T3)
 Winners 2002–03, 2012–13: 2
 Runners-up 2001–02, 2003–04: 2
 Vila de Gràcia Trophy
 Winners 2003, 2006, 2009, 2013, 2018, 2019: 6

Season to season

Current squad

External links
 Official club website

CE Europa
Women's football clubs in Spain
2001 establishments in Catalonia
Football clubs in Barcelona